Keith Gottschalk is a South African poet, known for his anti-apartheid poetry. He was born on the 14 March 1946 in Cape Town, where he still lives. He studied at the University of Cape Town 1964–70, where he was a tutor and junior lecturer to 1983.

Keith Gottschalk's poetry is political, and its appearance at cultural festival and mass rallies of the mass democratic movement attests to its massive success as political poetry. He is a performing poet, whose work needs to be heard as well as read.

He has given over one hundred performances of his poems, and also had over one hundred poems published in magazines such as New Coin, New Contrast, Phoebe, Staffrider and Agenda. His first collection was Emergency Poems.

In his introduction to Emergency Poems Peter Horn described Gottschalk's contribution as follows: "wit and conceit also seem to me to describe most adequately the poetic and aesthetic vehicles which Gottschalk chooses to address the political in poetry. Often, when critics address poetry like Gottschalk's they use the term satire, this most misplaced and displaced genre in English poetry. What is central to satire and to wit is not, as popular misconception may have it, its comic quality, the funniness, but the sudden flashlike insight into the incongruous, as Freud has clearly shown in his study on the Witz.  He was praised for his poems' "tight control and their strategy of irony." His modernisation of the traditional African praise poem "shows their continued existence and meaning for large portions of the population."

In 2021 he published Cosmonauts do it in Heaven, a collection of poems on spaceflight and astronomy

Academic career
He moved to the University of the Western Cape in 1984 and served as head of department in 2004-2006.

He is a Fulbright scholar.

He served as the chair of the Cape Centre of the Astronomical Society of Southern Africa from 2005 to 2006. He is also a member of the British Interplanetary Society and the South African Space Association.

See also
Literature of South Africa

References

Sources 
 
 
 
 
 

1946 births
Living people
University of Cape Town alumni
Academic staff of the University of the Western Cape
20th-century South African poets
White South African anti-apartheid activists
South African male poets
20th-century South African male writers